Scalable Networking Pack (SNP) is a set of additions that adds new features to Microsoft's Windows Server 2003 Service Pack 1 or later with architectural enhancements and APIs to support the new capabilities of network acceleration and hardware-based offload technologies.

Features 
 TCP chimney offload provides seamlessly integrated support for network adapters with TCP offload engines (TOE)
 Receive-side scaling dynamically load-balances inbound network connections across multiple processors or cores
 NetDMA enables support for advanced direct memory access technologies, such as Intel I/O Acceleration Technology (Intel I/OAT)

References

External links
Microsoft Scalable Networking
Introduction to the Windows Server 2003 Scalable Networking Pack
Scalable Networking Pack: Frequently Asked Questions

Windows Server